BRHS may stand for:
Braden River High School in Bradenton, Florida
Billy Ryan High School in Denton, Texas
Bishop Ready High School (Columbus, Ohio)
Bridgewater-Raritan High School in Bridgewater Township, New Jersey
Buena Regional High School in Buena, New Jersey
Broad Run High School in Ashburn, Virginia